Faymoreau is a commune in the Vendée department in the Pays de la Loire region in western France.

Demography
In 2008, 240 inhabitants were living in Faymoreau, 10% less than in 1999. The commune was ranked 24,953th nationally whereas it was ranked 22,623th in 1999 and 277th in the departmental rank, out of 282 communes. The numbers of inhabitants is taken thanks to a census of the population every five years, as it is done since the beginning of the 21st century in every French commune of less than 10,000 inhabitants. The last one for Faymoreau was taken in 2012, and any other numbers given (2006, 2008) are only projections. Because of mining activities (coal/charcoal) in the 19th century, Faymoreau once reached the number of 1,190 inhabitants in 1876. A record accounted for a strong immigration of polish mineworkers which is explained by the strong activity of the commune at the time. Puy de Serre, a neighbouring commune, was, between 1823 and 1883 part of Faymoreau, inflating logically the amount of inhabitants.

Population pyramid
The population of the commune is relatively old, despite the presence of a nursery school. Indeed, 36% of the people are over 60, which is way higher than the national rate (about 21%) and the departemental rate (barely 25%). It is good to know that 52.5% of the inhabitants of the village are women, which fits the national average of 51.6%. In recent years, a young population emerged, and now represents approximately 18% of the commune's population. However, the biggest age bracket is still represented by the men and women between 60 and 74 years old, making up a good quarter of the inhabitants of the commune.
Regarding the youth of the village, the nursery school, mentioned earlier, is welcoming an average of 18 pupils per year, with regular ups and downs. Once the nursery school is over for these children, they can continue their education in the neighbouring village Puy de Serre, where a primary school is located.
We can note that the nursery school welcomes all children of the group of neighbouring villages, Faymoreau, Puy de Serre and Marillet.

Places and monuments to visit
 The "Mining Centre", "Centre Minier" in French, a location made up of a museum, "Le Musée de La Mine" taking you through the history of the charcoal mine of Faymoreau.
 The mining village and its chapel (19th century) of which its stained glass windows were rebuilt by Carmelo Zagari as a tribute to the underground workers (it was a public order in 2001).
 The flood barrier, an actual pond were anyone is welcome to fish for a little amount of money.
 "L'Hôtel des Mines", the restaurant of the village which used to be an actual hotel but only remained a restaurant and a bar.
 The market town, the main entrance of the village in some sort, which contains the church of the village, the church of Saint Louis (built in 1883, not to mix up with the chapel though they have been built in the same century), the church of Saint Louis, actually in renovation (of the outward appearance and of the church tower), and this until 2013–14.
 The forests, mostly private properties, can though be crossed, as many campaign roads of the market town pass through them.
 Also, one can rest and spend holidays in the commune as "gîtes" and "chambres d'hôtes" opened in the last decade and are available for rent in the spring and summer months.

The Mine
The Faymoreau mine was a charcoal mine. Basically, it was a coal deposit discovered by chance in 1827 by a clog-maker. This vein will soon become a real mine, as other lodes were found out, attracting miners from the entire region, but also from different parts of Europe as the mine was offering a lot of job offers. Thus for more than a century, French, Polish and Italian miners will cohabit in the mine and live split-up in the mining village. This mine will be the main economic interest of the village, until its closing in 1958. Nowadays, the museum of the mine relates its story, describing its growth, its special events and accidents and its fall, but also the miners' condition at work.

See also
Communes of the Vendée department

References

Communes of Vendée